The Eugie Foster Memorial Award for Short Fiction is an annual juried award presented to the author of a piece of short speculative fiction (20,000 words or fewer) published during the previous calendar year. It seeks to recognize fiction that is "irreplacable" and that "will become essential to speculative fiction readers." The award is named in honour of Eugie Foster, a prolific speculative writer and editor. It was first presented in 2016 at the awards banquet at Dragon Con, and has continued to be presented at the same venue in years since.

Winners and nominees
In the following table, the years correspond to the date of the ceremony, rather than when the work was first published. Each year links to the corresponding "year in literature". Entries with a blue background and an asterisk (*) next to the writer's name have won the award; those with a white background are the other nominees on the shortlist.

  *   Winners

References

External links
 Official Website

Awards established in 2016
Lists of speculative fiction-related award winners and nominees
Science fiction awards
Short story awards
E